Michael Golden (15 August 1913 – 1983) was an Irish stage, film and television actor, mainly active in England. 
His stage work encompassed Shakespearean roles at Stratford in 1947; and as police inspectors in the original West End productions of Agatha Christie's plays Verdict and The Unexpected Guest in 1958.

Selected filmography

 A Canterbury Tale (1944) - Sergt. Smale
 Send for Paul Temple (1946) - Dixie
 Hungry Hill (1947) - Sam Donovan
 Escape (1948) - Detective Penter
 Calling Paul Temple (1948) - Frank Chester
 Noose (1948) - Moggie
 Another Shore (1948) - D.O. Broderick
 The Blue Lamp (1950) - Mike Randall (uncredited)
 Pool of London (1951) - Customs Officer Andrews
 Cry, the Beloved Country (1951) - Second reporter (uncredited)
 Salute the Toff (1952) - Benny Kless
 The Gentle Gunman (1952) - Murphy
 The Square Ring (1953) - Warren
 Operation Diplomat (1953) - Harrison
 36 Hours (1953) - The Inspector
 Murder by Proxy (1954) - Inspector Johnson
 The Green Scarf (1954) - Warder
 The Black Rider (1954) - Rakoff
 Track the Man Down (1955) - 'Wild' Max (uncredited)
 Cross Channel (1955) - W.L. Carrick
 Dial 999 (1955) - The Chief Inspector
 Women Without Men (1956) - Bargee
 Blonde Bait (1956) - Bargekeeper (uncredited)
 Up in the World (1956) - Nightclub Doorman (uncredited)
 The Man Without a Body (1957) - Nostradamus
 Date with Disaster (1957) - Det. Inspector Matthews
 The One That Got Away (1957) - First Detective (uncredited)
 Tread Softly Stranger (1958) - St. John's Ambulance Man
 Robbery with Violence (1958) - Inspector Wilson
 During One Night (1960) - Constable
 The Day They Robbed the Bank of England (1961) - Gamekeeper (uncredited)
 Murder, She Said (1961) - Hillman

Television roles
 Jude the Obscure (1971) - as Tinker Taylor
 Fall of Eagles (1974) - Putilov
 The Onedin Line (1976) - Storeman

Selected stage roles
 The Gentle Gunman (1950) - Shinto
 Verdict (1958) - Detective Inspector Ogden
 The Unexpected Guest (1958) - Inspector Thomas

References

External links
 

1913 births
1983 deaths
20th-century Irish male actors
Irish expatriates in England
Irish male stage actors
Irish male film actors
Irish male television actors
Male actors from County Wicklow
People from Bray, County Wicklow